Central York High School is a large, suburban, public high school in Springettsbury Township, York County, Pennsylvania. Located at 601 Mundis Mill Road, it is the sole high school operated by the Central York School District. In the 2017–2018 school year, enrollment was reported as 1,865 pupils in 9th through 12th grades.

Central York High School students may choose to attend York County School of Technology for training in architectural design, automotive technology, cosmetology, computer services, culinary fields and the construction and mechanical trades. The Lincoln Intermediate Unit IU12 provides the district and school with a wide variety of services like specialized education for disabled students and hearing, speech and visual disability services and professional development for staff and faculty.

Extracurriculars
Central York School District offers a wide variety of clubs, activities and an extensive sports program.

Sports
The district funds:
Varsity

Boys
Baseball – AAAA
Basketball – AAAA
Cross Country – AAA
Football – AAAA
Golf – AAA
Indoor Track and Field – AAAA
Lacrosse – AAAA
Soccer – AAA
Swimming and Diving – AAA
Tennis – AAA
Track and Field – AAA
Volleyball – AAA
Water Polo – AAA
Wrestling – AAA

Girls
Basketball – AAAA
Cheer – AAAA
Cross Country – AAA
Field Hockey – AAA
Golf – AAA
Indoor Track and Field – AAAA
Lacrosse – AAAA
Soccer (Fall) – AAA
Softball – AAA
Swimming and Diving – AAA
Girls' Tennis – AAA
Track and Field – AAA
Volleyball – AAA
Water Polo – AAAA

According to PIAA directory July 2014

Notable alumni

 Ben Beshore, NASCAR Cup Series crew chief for Kyle Busch
 John Fetterman, U.S. senator from Pennsylvania (2023–present)

References

Buildings and structures in York, Pennsylvania
Educational institutions in the United States with year of establishment missing
Public high schools in Pennsylvania
Schools in York County, Pennsylvania
Springettsbury Township, York County, Pennsylvania